Scopula fluidaria is a moth of the family Geometridae. It was described by Charles Swinhoe in 1886. It is endemic to Pakistan.

References

Moths described in 1886
fluidaria
Endemic fauna of Pakistan
Taxa named by Charles Swinhoe
Moths of Asia